Cosmosoma hector is a moth of the family Erebidae. It was described by Otto Staudinger in 1876. It is found in Panama.

References

hector
Moths described in 1876